Ajanta Group or Oreva Group (stylized as OREVA)  is a diversified group, active in textiles, transport, construction equipment, and machinery.

History 
The company was founded by Odhavaji Raghavji Patel in 1971. It is known for the manufacturing and exporting of clocks from India. 

In 2008, the company tried to launch and manufacture the Oreva Super, a low-cost electric car. It was dubbed "Tata Nano-Killer,"" reportedly costing less than INR100,000 or roughly around $.

Controversies 
In 2022, the company and its staff are being investigated for the collapse of a bridge in Morbi. The Municipality of Morbi owned the bridge, and they entered into a maintenance agreement with Oreva Group that was to last for 15 years. Initial reports say that the bridge was opened to the public ahead of schedule after temporary repairs, even though the much needed 'certificate of fitness' from the local authorities had not been obtained.

References

External links
 Official page

Companies based in Gujarat
Clock manufacturing companies of India
Year of establishment missing